The following are the national records in track cycling in Denmark by Denmarks's national cycling federation: Danish Cycling Federation (DCU).

Men
Key to tables:

Women

References
 Danish records August 2022 updated

External links
 DCU web site

Danish
Records
Track cycling
track cycling